Anna Harkowska (born 20 March 1980) is a Polish cyclist.  At the age of 14, she won two gold medals in the 1992 Barcelona Paralympics as a swimmer, however an ear infection left her unable to continue. She later trained in running and took up a triathlon, and eventually focused her efforts on cycling. In May 2002, she was hit by a car in Szczecin, sustaining 26 fractures in her legs and nearly losing her left leg. After several surgeries and months of rehabilitation, she returned to professional cycling. In 2012, she participated in the 2012 Summer Paralympics in London, where she won three silver medals.

References

Notes

Sources

External links 
 

1980 births
Living people
Polish female cyclists
Paralympic cyclists of Poland
Paralympic silver medalists for Poland
Cyclists at the 2012 Summer Paralympics
Cyclists at the 2016 Summer Paralympics
Medalists at the 2012 Summer Paralympics
Medalists at the 2016 Summer Paralympics
People from Świnoujście
Sportspeople from West Pomeranian Voivodeship
Paralympic medalists in cycling
21st-century Polish women
20th-century Polish women